Portrait of a Young Man is an oil on wood painting by Rosso Fiorentino, executed c. 1517–1518, now in the Gemäldegalerie, Berlin.

In his Lives of the Artists Vasari briefly mentions that many portraits by him could still be seen in Florentine homes, probably produced before Rosso left for Volterra in 1521 - this work is thought to be one of them. Its attribution was uncertain until 2006, when Antonio Natali identified it as an early autograph work by Rosso.

Subject
In the early 1900s it was thought to be a self-portrait of Rosso, but other sources argue that it instead shows Iacopo V Appiani, sovereign of Piombino, and is linked to Rosso's long stay in the city-state of Piombino in 1516–1520, during which he produced a Dead Christ.

See also
Portrait of a Man (Rosso Fiorentino)

References

Portraits by Rosso Fiorentino
1518 paintings
Portraits of men
Paintings in the Gemäldegalerie, Berlin